Kodumudi taluk is a taluk of Erode district of the Indian state of Tamil Nadu. Kodumudi became a separate taluk in Erode district by trifurcation of the erst-while Erode taluk, along with Modakurichi taluk on 8 March 2016. The new taluk will have control over the same geographic entity of the Kodumudi revenue block with Kodumudi as the headquarters. It falls under Erode Revenue division.

Demographics
According to the 2011 census, the erstwhile Erode taluk had a population of 820,720 with 410,323 males and 410,397 females. There were 1000 women for every 1000 men. The taluk had a literacy rate of 73.5. Child population in the age group below 6 was 35,016 Males and 33,498 Females. Whereas after trifurcation of the taluk, the newly created Kodumudi taluk will have a population of 107,466 approximately.

Populated Towns and Villages
 Sivagiri
 Kandasamypalayam 
 Pasur
 Unjalur
 Thamaraipalayam
 Vellottamparappu
 Anjur

See also
Kodumudi block

References

External links
 https://web.archive.org/web/20180330160655/http://www.erode.tn.nic.in/taluk.htm

Taluks of Erode district